VNUHCM-University of Information Technology (VNUHCM-UIT) is a public university located in Ho Chi Minh City, Vietnam, a member of Vietnam National University, Ho Chi Minh City. Although its name is about information technology, this university teaches many computer studies. The first course was inaugurated on 6 November 2006.

History
The predecessor of this university was Center for IT Development. On 8 June 2006, the Vietnamese prime minister signed Decision no. 134/2006/QĐ-TTg to establish this university.

Academic programs
Undergraduate programs
Computer Sciences
Data Science
Information Systems
Computer Engineering
Electronic Commerce
Computer Networks and Communications
Software Engineering
Information Technology
Information Security
Graduate programs:
Computer Sciences
Information Systems
Information Security
Information Technology

Research fields
 Knowledge Engineering
 Signal Processing
 Computer Network Protocols
 Network Security
 Multimedia Processing
 Mobile Network
 Embedded & VLSI Design
 IoT & Robotics
 Geographic Information Systems(GIS)

References

External links 
 Introduction of the University of IT
 Introduction of Center for IT Development

Universities in Ho Chi Minh City